Barqulong-e Bajuli (also Romanized as Barqūlong-e Bājūlī; also known as Bardqolong and Barqolong) is a village in Sepidar Rural District, in the Central District of Boyer-Ahmad County, Kohgiluyeh and Boyer-Ahmad Province, Iran. At the 2006 census, its population was 54, in 14 families.

References 

Populated places in Boyer-Ahmad County